Walter Quinton (13 December 1917 – 8 March 1996) was an English professional footballer who made 85 appearances in the Football League playing for Rotherham United, Birmingham City, Brentford and Shrewsbury Town.

Career
Quinton was born in Anston, which was then in the West Riding of Yorkshire. He played local football for Dinnington Athletic before joining Rotherham United of the Football League Third Division North in July 1938. Described as "an accomplished right back", Quinton made his debut on 8 October 1938 and played in every game but one for the rest of the 1938–39 season.

In the 1939 close season, he signed for Birmingham, newly relegated to the Second Division, but the suspension of competitive football for the duration of the Second World War prevented him proving himself at the higher level. A short, stocky defender, he played more than 100 games for Birmingham in the wartime leagues, but his only appearances in the Football League came as a run of eight games early in the 1947–48 season; Ken Green took over the right-back position as soon as he was demobbed.

Together with Jackie Goodwin, Quinton joined Brentford in a £7000 deal in April 1949. He had one season in the first team before dropping to the reserves, then, after a trial with Southend United in August 1952, he finished off his league career with a few games for Shrewsbury Town. He later played for Snowdown Colliery Welfare of the Kent League.

After retiring from play, Quinton moved back to Birmingham, where he worked for electrical goods manufacturers Bulpitt & Sons. Quinton died at Sheffield in 1996, aged 78.

References

1917 births
1996 deaths
Footballers from Rotherham
English footballers
Association football fullbacks
Dinnington Athletic F.C. players
Rotherham United F.C. players
Birmingham City F.C. players
Brentford F.C. players
Shrewsbury Town F.C. players
English Football League players
Snowdown Colliery Welfare F.C. players
Kent Football League (1894–1959) players